Crockerella castianira is a species of sea snail, a marine gastropod mollusk in the family Clathurellidae, the cone snails and their allies.

Description

Distribution

References

 Dall (1919) Descriptions of new species of Mollusca from the North Pacific Ocean; Proceedings of the U.S. National Museum, vol. 56 (1920) 

castianira